Robert Van't Hof (born April 10, 1959) is a former professional tennis player from the United States.

Early life 
Van't Hof was born in Lynwood, California.

Education 
Van't Hof studied for three years at the University of Southern California, winning the National Collegiate Athletic Association singles title in 1980. He left the University without being awarded a degree, in order to pursue his tennis career.

Van't Hof was inducted into the Intercollegiate Tennis Association Hall of Fame in 2003.

Professional career 
Turning professional in 1980, Van't Hof won his first top-level singles title in 1981 at Taipei and his second in 1989 in Seoul. His best singles performance at a Grand Slam event came in 1983 at Wimbledon, where he reached the final 16.

Van't Hof won two top-level singles titles and six tour doubles titles, including the Pacific Southwest with Scott Davis in 1985, as an unseeded team. His career-high rankings were World No. 25 in singles (in 1983), and World No. 20 in doubles (in 1986). He retired from the professional tour in 1990.

Coaching
After retiring as a player, Van't Hof worked as a coach to players including Lindsay Davenport, Todd Martin, and Coco Vandeweghe.

Career finals

Singles

Doubles

References

External links 
 
 

American male tennis players
American people of Dutch descent
American tennis coaches
People from Lynwood, California
USC Trojans men's tennis players
Tennis people from California
1959 births
Living people